A Sun That Never Sets is the seventh studio album from the Californian band Neurosis. The album was awarded #18 on Decibel Magazine's top 100 metal albums of the decade. The band later released a DVD of a full-length film, which the album accompanies.

Track listing

Personnel

Performance

Neurosis 

Scott Kelly – guitar, vocals
Noah Landis – keyboards, sampling, sound manipulation
Jason Roeder – drums
Steve Von Till – guitar, vocals
Dave Edwardson – bass, backing vocals

Additional personnel 

Kris Force – violin, viola

Production
Chris Manfrin – assistant engineer
Greg Norman – assistant engineer
John Golden – mastering
Steve Albini – engineer, producer

References

2001 albums
Neurosis (band) albums
Albums produced by Steve Albini